Matthew Edward Hurles   is head of human genetics at the Wellcome Sanger Institute and an honorary professor of Human Genetics and Genomics at the University of Cambridge.

Education
Hurles was educated at the University of Oxford where he was awarded a Bachelor of Arts degree in Biochemistry. He completed his PhD in 1999 on the genetics of the Y chromosome at the University of Leicester supervised by

Research and career
Hurles research investigates the causes and consequences of new mutations as DNA is passed from one generation to the next. He is best known for his work on characterizing the extent and impact of structural variation in the human genome and on deciphering the genetic architecture of severe neurodevelopmental disorders.

Hurles group has used large-scale genomic studies to highlight the predominant role that new mutations of many different types play in causing diverse developmental disorders and has led to the discovery of tens of previously unrecognised genetic diseases.

Awards and honours
Hurles was elected a Fellow of the Royal Society (FRS) in 2019. He is also a Fellow of the Academy of Medical Sciences (FMedSci) and was awarded the Crick Medal and Lecture in 2013.

References

Fellows of the Royal Society
Fellows of the Academy of Medical Sciences (United Kingdom)
Living people
1974 births